The 2008 ITU Triathlon World Championships were held in Vancouver, British Columbia, Canada from June 5 to June 8, 2008.

Medal summary

References
ITU World Championships Results (Archived 2009-09-26)

2008
World Championships
Triathlon World Championships
2008 in British Columbia
International sports competitions hosted by Canada
Triathlon competitions in Canada